The women's 4 × 400 metres relay at the 2012 World Junior Championships in Athletics was held at the Estadi Olímpic Lluís Companys on 14 and 15 July 2012.

Medalists

Records
, the existing world junior and championship records were as follows.

Results

Heats
Qualification: First 3 of each heat (Q) plus the 2 fastest times (q) qualified

Final

Participation
According to an unofficial count, 59 athletes from 13 countries participated in the event.

References

External links
WJC12 4×400 metres relay schedule

4 x 400 metres relay
Relays at the World Athletics U20 Championships
2012 in women's athletics